Madhuca cheongiana is a plant in the family Sapotaceae.

Description
The bark is brown. Inflorescences bear up to 10 white flowers.

Distribution and habitat
Madhuca cheongiana is endemic to Borneo. Its habitat is mixed dipterocarp and kerangas forests to  altitude.

Conservation
Madhuca cheongiana has been assessed as vulnerable on the IUCN Red List. The species is threatened by logging and conversion of land for palm oil plantations.

References

cheongiana
Endemic flora of Borneo
Trees of Borneo
Plants described in 2001